The North Mississippi Classic was a golf tournament on the Web.com Tour. It was played in April 2018 at the Country Club of Oxford in Oxford, Mississippi.

Winners

Bolded golfers graduated to the PGA Tour via the Web.com Tour regular-season money list.

Notes

References

External links

Coverage on the Web.com Tour's official site

Former Korn Ferry Tour events
Golf in Mississippi
Sports in Oxford, Mississippi